William Sharpe Hinds (born 1906, date of death unknown) was a unionist politician in Northern Ireland.

Hinds grew up in Belfast, becoming the owner of an engineering business.  He was also elected as an Ulster Unionist Party Member of Belfast City Council.  At the 1958 Northern Ireland general election, he was elected in Belfast Willowfield, and he served until his defeat in 1969 by independent Unionist Tom Caldwell.  While he had the support at that election of the Ormeau Unionist Association and the Willowfield Women's Unionist Association, the Willowfield Unionist Club, another local affiliate of the Ulster Unionist Council, backed Caldwell, and this split became a long-term dispute among party activists in the area.

References

1906 births
Year of death missing
Members of Belfast City Council
Members of the House of Commons of Northern Ireland 1958–1962
Members of the House of Commons of Northern Ireland 1962–1965
Members of the House of Commons of Northern Ireland 1965–1969
Politicians from Belfast
Ulster Unionist Party members of the House of Commons of Northern Ireland
Members of the House of Commons of Northern Ireland for Belfast constituencies
Ulster Unionist Party councillors